Albov is a Russian surname. Notable people with the surname include:

Mikhail Albov (1851–1911), Russian writer
Nikolai Albov (1866–1897), Russian botanist and geographer

See also
Alov (surname)

Russian-language surnames